Lawn bowls at the 2006 Commonwealth Games was held at the State Lawn Bowls Centre in John Cain Memorial Park in Thornbury, Victoria, Australia.

Medal count

Medallists

Results

Men's singles – round robin 
Section A

Section B

Section C

Section D

Finals

Men's pairs – round robin 
Section A

Section B

Section C

Section D

Finals

Men's Triples – round robin 
Section A

Section B

Section C

Section D

Finals

Women's singles – round robin 
Section A

Section B

Section C

Section D

Finals

Women's pairs – round robin 
Section A

Section B

Finals

Women's Triples – round robin 
Section A

Section B

Finals

Competition format
The lawn bowls program lasted over nine days with competition for both men and women in singles, pairs and triples. The preliminary rounds were held in a round-robin with the top eight in the competition making the quarter finals. From the quarter finals, the games were on a knockout format. The winners of the semi-finals played in the final to decide the gold and silver medallists.

Venue
The State Lawn Bowls Centre was developed especially for the 2006 Commonwealth Games. In June 2003, Gordon Rich-Phillips, the Victorian Opposition spokesman on the Commonwealth Games, claimed that the venue was ten months behind schedule. Justin Madden, the minister responsible for the Commonwealth Games, claimed that the delay was due to community consultation to ensure that the venue met expectations but was confident that the venue would be ready. The venue was built in time for the Games.

References
 ABC Online report on outcome of 2002 Commonwealth Games competition in lawn bowls
 AAP Report "Australia, Scotland and NZ clash this week" May 15, 2005
 ABC "Games venues behind schedule: Vic Opposition" 19 June 2003
 ABC "Commonwealth Games countdown commences" 19 June 2003

See also
List of Commonwealth Games medallists in lawn bowls
Lawn bowls at the Commonwealth Games

 
2006 Commonwealth Games events
2006 in bowls
Bowls in Australia
2006